Sikasso Region (Bambara: ߛߌߞߊߛߏ ߘߌߣߋߖߊ tr. Sikaso Dineja) is the southernmost region of Mali. The region's capital city, Sikasso, is the country's second-largest city. Major ethnic groups include the Senoufo, known for masks and reverence for animals, the Samago, known for being Mali's best farmers, and the main ethnic group in Mali, the Bambara people.

Administrative divisions

Sikasso Region is divided into seven cercles:

The city of Sikasso is known for a vibrant outdoor market which features fabrics, numerous vegetables and fruits (especially mangoes, for which Sikasso is particularly renowned.)  Sikasso is an ethnic and linguistic melting pot featuring people from outlying villages, immigrants from Côte d'Ivoire and Burkina Faso and refugees.

The southwest corner of the Sikasso region is traditionally known as Wassoulou.  This area is known for its unique music and strong tradition of hunting.  The main city of Wassoulou is Yanfolila.

Besides the regional capital, the other urban communes and major cities in Sikasso Region are Bougouni, a junction town en route to Bamako (the capital of Mali), and Koutiala in the northern part of Sikasso Region, which is the hub of Mali's highly productive cotton industry, which produces one of the country's few exports.

Communities
 Mandela

See also
Regions of Mali
Cercles of Mali

References

External links
.
.

 
Regions of Mali